Tiergarten is a digital extended play (EP) recording by Rufus Wainwright, released under Geffen Records in the United Kingdom on October 29, 2007. The EP contains one track: "Supermayer Lost in Tiergarten." This track, a remix of "Tiergarten" from Wainwright's album Release the Stars, was also featured as a single in limited vinyl release (500 copies total).

Track listing
"Supermayer Lost in Tiergarten"

References

External links
Rufus Wainwright official site

2007 EPs
Rufus Wainwright albums